"Wasted Time" is a song by Skid Row. It was their third single released from their second album, Slave to the Grind. The song was released in 1991 and written by bandmates Sebastian Bach, Rachel Bolan and Dave "the Snake" Sabo. It became the band's last song to appear on the US Billboard Hot 100 and was promoted with a music video.

Background
Lead singer Sebastian Bach said the song was written about the spiraling effect of drug use on his friend Steven Adler, the original drummer of hard rock band Guns N' Roses.

The song reached number 88 on the Billboard Hot 100, number 30 on the Mainstream Rock Tracks and number 20 on the UK Singles chart. Some versions of the single included the Rush cover "What You're Doing".

Track listing
 "Wasted Time" (Edit)
 "Psycho Love"
 "Get The Fuck Out" (Live)
 "Holidays in the Sun" (originally performed by Sex Pistols)

Charts

References

Skid Row (American band) songs
1991 singles
1991 songs
Atlantic Records singles
Heavy metal ballads
Songs about heroin
Songs about suicide
Songs written by Dave Sabo
Songs written by Rachel Bolan